Sulfur (16S) has 23 known isotopes with mass numbers ranging from 27 to 49, four of which are stable: 32S (95.02%), 33S (0.75%), 34S (4.21%), and 36S (0.02%). The preponderance of sulfur-32 is explained by its production from carbon-12 plus successive fusion capture of five helium-4 nuclei, in the so-called alpha process of exploding type II supernovas (see silicon burning).

Other than 35S, the radioactive isotopes of sulfur are all comparatively short-lived. 35S is formed from cosmic ray spallation of 40Ar in the atmosphere. It has a half-life of 87 days. The next longest-lived radioisotope is sulfur-38, with a half-life of 170 minutes. The shortest-lived is 49S, with a half-life shorter than 200 nanoseconds. Heavier radioactive isotopes of sulfur decay to chlorine.

When sulfide minerals are precipitated, isotopic equilibration among solids and liquid may cause small differences in the δ34S values of co-genetic minerals. The differences between minerals can be used to estimate the temperature of equilibration. The δ13C and δ34S of coexisting carbonates and sulfides can be used to determine the pH and oxygen fugacity of the ore-bearing fluid during ore formation.

In most forest ecosystems, sulfate is derived mostly from the atmosphere; weathering of ore minerals and evaporites also contribute some sulfur. Sulfur with a distinctive isotopic composition has been used to identify pollution sources, and enriched sulfur has been added as a tracer in hydrologic studies. Differences in the natural abundances can also be used in systems where there is sufficient variation in the 34S of ecosystem components. Rocky Mountain lakes thought to be dominated by atmospheric sources of sulfate have been found to have different δ34S values from oceans believed to be dominated by watershed sources of sulfate.

List of isotopes 

|-
| rowspan=3|27S
| rowspan=3 style="text-align:right" | 16
| rowspan=3 style="text-align:right" | 11
| rowspan=3|27.01828(43)#
| rowspan=3|15.5(15) ms
| β+ (96.6%)
| 27P
| rowspan=3|(5/2+)
| rowspan=3|
| rowspan=3|
|-
| β+, p (2.3%)
| 26Si
|-
| β+, 2p (1.1%)
| 25Al
|-
| rowspan=2|28S
| rowspan=2 style="text-align:right" | 16
| rowspan=2 style="text-align:right" | 12
| rowspan=2|28.00437(17)
| rowspan=2|125(10) ms
| β+ (79.3%)
| 28P
| rowspan=2|0+
| rowspan=2|
| rowspan=2|
|-
| β+, p (20.7%)
| 27Si
|-
| rowspan=2|29S
| rowspan=2 style="text-align:right" | 16
| rowspan=2 style="text-align:right" | 13
| rowspan=2|28.99661(5)
| rowspan=2|188(4) ms
| β+ (53.6%)
| 29P
| rowspan=2|5/2+#
| rowspan=2|
| rowspan=2|
|-
| β+, p (46.4%)
| 28Si
|-
| 30S
| style="text-align:right" | 16
| style="text-align:right" | 14
| 29.98490677(22)
| 1.1759(17) s
| β+
| 30P
| 0+
|
|
|-
| 31S
| style="text-align:right" | 16
| style="text-align:right" | 15
| 30.97955701(25)
| 2.5534(18) s
| β+
| 31P
| 1/2+
|
|
|-
| 32S
| style="text-align:right" | 16
| style="text-align:right" | 16
| 31.9720711744(14)
| colspan=3 align=center|Stable
| 0+
| 0.9499(26)
| 0.94454-0.95281
|-
| 33S
| style="text-align:right" | 16
| style="text-align:right" | 17
| 32.9714589099(15)
| colspan=3 align=center|Stable
| 3/2+
| 0.0075(2)
| 0.00730-0.00793
|-
| 34S
| style="text-align:right" | 16
| style="text-align:right" | 18
| 33.96786701(5)
| colspan=3 align=center|Stable
| 0+
| 0.0425(24)
| 0.03976-0.04734
|-
| 35S
| style="text-align:right" | 16
| style="text-align:right" | 19
| 34.96903232(4)
| 87.37(4) d
| β−
| 35Cl
| 3/2+
| Trace
|
|-
| 36S
| style="text-align:right" | 16
| style="text-align:right" | 20
| 35.96708070(20)
| colspan=3 align=center|Stable
| 0+
| 0.0001(1)
| 0.00013−0.00027
|-
| 37S
| style="text-align:right" | 16
| style="text-align:right" | 21
| 36.97112551(21)
| 5.05(2) min
| β−
| 37Cl
| 7/2−
|
|
|-
| 38S
| style="text-align:right" | 16
| style="text-align:right" | 22
| 37.971163(8)
| 170.3(7) min
| β−
| 38Cl
| 0+
|
|
|-
| 39S
| style="text-align:right" | 16
| style="text-align:right" | 23
| 38.97513(5)
| 11.5(5) s
| β−
| 39Cl
| (7/2)−
|
|
|-
| 40S
| style="text-align:right" | 16
| style="text-align:right" | 24
| 39.975483(4)
| 8.8(22) s
| β−
| 40Cl
| 0+
|
|
|-
| rowspan=2|41S
| rowspan=2 style="text-align:right" | 16
| rowspan=2 style="text-align:right" | 25
| rowspan=2|40.979593(4)
| rowspan=2|1.99(5) s
| β− (>99.9%)
| 41Cl
| rowspan=2|7/2−#
| rowspan=2|
| rowspan=2|
|-
| β−, n (<.1%)
| 40Cl
|-
| rowspan=2|42S
| rowspan=2 style="text-align:right" | 16
| rowspan=2 style="text-align:right" | 26
| rowspan=2|41.981065(3)
| rowspan=2|1.016(15) s
| β− (>96%)
| 42Cl
| rowspan=2|0+
| rowspan=2|
| rowspan=2|
|-
| β−, n (<4%)
| 41Cl
|-
| rowspan=2|43S
| rowspan=2 style="text-align:right" | 16
| rowspan=2 style="text-align:right" | 27
| rowspan=2|42.986908(5)
| rowspan=2|265(13) ms
| β− (60%)
| 43Cl
| rowspan=2|3/2−#
| rowspan=2|
| rowspan=2|
|-
| β−, n (40%)
| 42Cl
|-
| style="text-indent:1em" | 43mS
| colspan="3" style="text-indent:2em" | 319(5) keV
| 415.0(26) ns
|
|
| (7/2−)
|
|
|-
| rowspan=2|44S
| rowspan=2 style="text-align:right" | 16
| rowspan=2 style="text-align:right" | 28
| rowspan=2|43.990119(6)
| rowspan=2|100(1) ms
| β− (81.7%)
| 44Cl
| rowspan=2|0+
| rowspan=2|
| rowspan=2|
|-
| β−, n (18.2%)
| 43Cl
|-
| style="text-indent:1em" | 44mS
| colspan="3" style="text-indent:2em" | 1365.0(8) keV
| 2.619(26) µs
|
|
| 0+
|
|
|-
| rowspan=2|45S
| rowspan=2 style="text-align:right" | 16
| rowspan=2 style="text-align:right" | 29
| rowspan=2|44.99572(111)
| rowspan=2|68(2) ms
| β−, n (54%)
| 44Cl
| rowspan=2|3/2−#
| rowspan=2|
| rowspan=2|
|-
| β− (46%)
| 45Cl
|-
| 46S
| style="text-align:right" | 16
| style="text-align:right" | 30
| 46.00037(54)#
| 50(8) ms
| β−
| 46Cl
| 0+
|
|
|-
| 47S
| style="text-align:right" | 16
| style="text-align:right" | 31
| 47.00791(54)#
| 20# ms[>200 ns]
| β−
| 47Cl
| 3/2−#
|
|
|-
| 48S
| style="text-align:right" | 16
| style="text-align:right" | 32
| 48.01370(64)#
| 10# ms[>200 ns]
| β−
| 48Cl
| 0+
|
|
|-
| 49S
| style="text-align:right" | 16
| style="text-align:right" | 33
| 49.02264(72)#
| 
| β−
| 49Cl
| 3/2−#
|
|

See also 
 Sulfur isotope biogeochemistry

References

External links 
Sulfur isotopes data from The Berkeley Laboratory Isotopes Project's

 
Sulfur
Sulfur